David Mathers may refer to:

David Mathers (footballer), Scottish footballer
David Mathers (curler), Canadian curler